Roxita reductella is a moth in the family Crambidae. It was described by David E. Gaskin in 1984. It is found in north-eastern India.

References

Crambinae
Moths described in 1984